The defending champion, Dinara Safina, did not participate in 2004.

Anabel Medina Garrigues won her second WTA title here in 2004.

Seeds

Draw

Finals

Top half

Bottom half

References

Internazionali Femminili di Palermo - Singles
2004 Singles
Sport in Palermo
Tennis in Italy